The Child Bitten by A Lobster is a drawing by Sofonisba Anguissola, executed in chalk and pencil on light blue paper, and dated to around 1554. It is in the collection of the Museo di Capodimonte, in Naples.

History 
This drawing was originally in the collection of cardinal Fulvio Orsini; around 1600 it was inherited by cardinal Odoardo Farnese, together with other works by Sofonisba Anguissola: The Game of Chess, the Self Portrait at the Spinet, and an unidentified drawing. Then it came to the Bourbon of Naples, via the Farnese inheritance and is present in the 1644 and 1653 inventories of Palazzo Farnese, in Roma. In 1799 was taken to Naples and here the attribution to Sofonisba Anguissola was lost.

From a letter written by Tommaso Cavalieri to Cosimo I de' Medici, on 20 January 1562, accompanying the gift of two drawings (one of which was the Old Woman Studying the Alphabet and Laughing Girl by Sofonisba Anguissola and the other was Cleopatra di Michelangelo Buonarroti), we know that Child Bitten by A Lobster has been made on the suggestion of Michelangelo - to whom it has been sent for viewing - and depicted Asdrubale, the younger brother of Sofonisba (born in 1551):

According to Roberto Longhi, this version was originally thought it was a copy and the original drawing was in Berlin in a private collection. It was then attributed to a Santi di Tito and the Berlin drawing was then considered a copy. Engravings were made from this drawing.

Description 
The child (Asdrubale Anguissola) has put his hand in a basket, where a lobster is hidden. He cries from the sudden pain, next to his little sister (Europa Anguissola). This drawing of the Child Bitten by a Lobster, that anticipates Caravaggio's Boy Bitten by a Lizard, depicts one of the first expressions by the artist in which a sudden physical pain provokes an outpouring of grief. The naturalism, deriving from the studies of physiognomy by Leonardo da Vinci, spread in 1550s Lombardy and was also taken up by Anguissola.

Bibliography 

 Roberto Longhi, Me pinxit e quesiti caravaggeschi: 1928-1934, Firenze, Sansoni, 1968, SBN IT\ICCU\UFI\0150711. Ristampa di studi pubblicati dal 1928 al 1934.
 Flavio Caroli, Sofonisba Anguissola e le sue sorelle, Milano, A. Mondadori, 1987, SBN IT\ICCU\CFI\0111864.
 AA VV, Sofonisba Anguissola e le sue sorelle, Milano, Leonardo arte, 1994, SBN IT\ICCU\VEA\0063954. Catalogo della mostra tenuta a Cremona nel 1994, a Vienna e a Washington nel 1995.
 Giulio Bora, Sofonisba Anguissola e la formazione cremonese: il ruolo del disegno, in Sofonisba Anguissola e le sue sorelle, Milano, Leonardo arte, 1994, pp. 79-88, SBN IT\ICCU\VEA\0063954.
 Flavio Caroli, Ritratti di famiglia in un interno, un fanciullo, un granchio e la Fisiognomica del Cinquecento, in Sofonisba Anguissola e le sue sorelle, Milano, Leonardo arte, 1994, pp. 47-56, SBN IT\ICCU\VEA\0063954.
 (EN) Italian women artists from Renaissance to Baroque, Milano, Skira, 2007, SBN IT\ICCU\VEA\0702687.

References 

1550s drawings